Papaver somniferum, commonly known as the opium poppy or breadseed poppy, is a species of flowering plant in the family Papaveraceae. It is the species of plant from which both opium and poppy seeds are derived and is also a valuable ornamental plant, grown in gardens. Its native range is probably the eastern Mediterranean, but is now obscured by ancient introductions and cultivation, being naturalized across much of Europe and Asia.

This poppy is grown as an agricultural crop on a large scale, for one of three primary purposes. The first is to produce seeds that are eaten by humans, commonly known as poppy seed. The second is to produce opium for use mainly by the pharmaceutical industry. The third is to produce other alkaloids, mainly thebaine and oripavine, that are processed by the pharmaceutical industry into drugs such as hydrocodone and oxycodone. Each of these goals has special breeds that are targeted at one of these businesses, and breeding efforts (including biotechnological ones) are continually underway. A comparatively small amount of P. somniferum is also produced commercially for ornamental purposes.

The common name "opium poppy" is increasingly a misnomer as many varieties have been bred that do not produce a significant quantity of opium. The cultivar 'Sujata' produces no latex at all. Breadseed poppy is more accurate as a common name today because all varieties of P. somniferum produce edible seeds. This differentiation has strong implications for legal policy surrounding the growing of this plant.

Description
The plant is strongly glaucous, giving a greyish-green appearance, and the stem and leaves bear a sparse distribution of coarse hairs. The large leaves are lobed, the upper stem leaves clasping the stem, the lowest leaves with a short petiole. The flowers are up to  diameter, normally with four white, mauve or red petals, sometimes with dark markings at the base. The fruit is a hairless, rounded capsule topped with 12–18 radiating stigmatic rays, or fluted cap. All parts of the plant exude white latex when wounded. In Australia, plant density for optimal cultivation is about 800,000 per hectare.

The weed poppy Papaver rhoeas is a similar species.

Metabolism 
The alkaloids are organic nitrogenous compounds, derivatives of secondary metabolism, synthesized through the metabolic pathway of benzylisoquinoline. First, the amino acid phenylalanine, through the enzyme phenylalanine hydroxylase, is transformed into tyrosine. Tyrosine can follow two different routes: by tyrosine hydroxylase it can form L-dopamine (L-DOPA), or it can be reduced to form 4-phenylhydroxyacetaldehyde (4-HPAA). Subsequently, L-DOPA reacts with 4-HPAA and, through a series of reactions, forms (S) -norcoclaurine, which carries the benzylisoquinoline skeleton that gives its name to this pathway. The conversion of (S) -norcoclaurin to (S) -reticulin is one of the key points, since from (S) -reticulin morphine can be formed through the morphinan route, noscapine through the path of the noscapina or berberina.

Genome 
The poppy genome contains 51,213 genes encoding proteins distributed 81.6% in 11 individual chromosomes and 18.4% remaining in unplaced scaffolds. In addition, 70.9% of the genome is made up of repetitive elements, of which the most represented are the long terminal repeat retrotransposons. This enrichment of genes is related to the maintenance of homeostasis and a positive regulation of transcription.

The analysis of synergy of the opium poppy reveals traces of segmental duplications 110 million years ago (MYA), before the divergence between Papaveraceae and Ranunculaceae, and an event of duplication of the complete genome makes 7.8 MYA.

The genes are possibly grouped as follows:

 The genes responsible for the conversion of (S) -reticulin to noscapine are found on chromosome 11.
 The genes responsible for the conversion of (S) -reticulin to thebaine are found on chromosome 11.
 The genes responsible for the conversion of thebaine are found in chromosome 1, chromosome 2, chromosome 7, and perhaps others.

Taxonomy 
Papaver somniferum was formally described by the Swedish botanist Carl Linnaeus in his seminal publication Species Plantarum in 1753 on page 508.

Varieties and cultivars 

P. somniferum has had a very long tradition of use, starting in the Neolithic. This long period of time allowed the development of a broad range of different forms. In total there are 52 botanical varieties. Breeding of P. somniferum faces a challenge caused by the contradictory breeding goals for this species. On one hand a very high content of alkaloids is requested for medical uses. The global demand for the alkaloids and the pharmaceutical derivatives has increased in the past years. Therefore, there is a need for the development of varieties with a high opium yield. On the other hand, the food industry demands as low alkaloid contents as possible.

There is one accepted subspecies, P. somniferum subsp. setigerum (DC.) Arcang. There are also many varieties and cultivars. Colors of the flowers vary widely, as do other physical characteristics, such as number and shape of petals , number of flowers and fruits, number of seeds, color of seeds, and production of opium. Papaver somniferum var. paeoniflorum is a variety with flowers that are highly double, and are grown in many colors. P. somniferum var. laciniatum is a variety with flowers that are highly double and deeply lobed. The variety Sujata produces no latex and no commercial utility for opioid production.

Distribution and habitat
The native range of opium poppy is probably the Eastern Mediterranean, but extensive cultivation and introduction of the species throughout Europe since ancient times have obscured its origin. It has escaped from cultivation, or has been introduced and become naturalized extensively in all regions of the British Isles, particularly in the south and east and in almost all other countries of the world with suitable, temperate climates.

Ecology

Diseases 
P. somniferum is susceptible to several fungal, insect and virus infections including seed borne diseases such as downy mildew and root rot. The use of pesticides in combination to cultural methods have been considered as major control measures for various poppy diseases.

The fungal pathogen Peronospora arborescens, the causal agent of downy mildew, occurs preferentially during wet and humid conditions. This oomycete penetrates the roots through oospores and infects the leaves as conidia in a secondary infection. The fungus causes hypertrophy and curvature of the stem and flower stalks. The symptoms are chlorosis and curling of the affected tissues with necrotic spots. The leaf under-surface is covered with a downy mildew coating containing conidiospores that spread the infection further leading to plant damage and death. Another downy mildew species, Peronospora somniferi, produces systemic infections leading to stunting and deformation of poppy plants. Downy mildew can be controlled preventively at the initial stage of seed development through several fungicide applications.

Leaf blight caused by the fungus Helminthosporium papaveris is one of the most destructive poppy diseases worldwide. The seed-borne fungus causes root rot in young plants and stunted stems in plants at a higher development stage, where leaf spots appear on the leaves and is being transmitted to capsules and seeds. Early sowing of seeds and deep plowing of poppy residues can reduce fungal inoculum during the plant growing season in the following year on neighboring poppy stocks, respectively.

Mosaic diseases in p. somniferum are caused by rattle virus and the Carlavirus. In 2006, a novel virus tentatively called "opium poppy mosaic virus" (OPMV) from the genus Umbravirus was isolated from p. somniferum containing leaf mosaic and mottling symptoms, in New Zealand.

Pests 
There are only a few pests that can do harm to P. somniferum.

Flea beetles perforate the leaves of young plants and aphids suck on the sap of the flower buds. The poppy root weevil (Stenocarus ruficornis) is another significant pest. The insect lives in the soil and migrates in spring to the poppy fields after crop emergence. Adults damage the leaves of small plants by eating them. Female lay their eggs into the tissue of lower leaves. Insect larvae hatch and burrow into the soil to complete their life cycle on the poppy roots as adults.

Cultivation  	

In the growth development of P. somniferum, six stages can be distinguished. The growth development starts with the growth of the seedlings. In a second step the rosette-type leaves and stalks are formed. After that budding (hook stage) takes place as a third step. The hook stage is followed by flowering. Subsequently, technical maturity is reached, which means that the plant is ready for cutting. The last step is biological maturity; dry seeds are ripened. The photoperiod seems to be the main determinant of flower development of P. somniferum.

P. somniferum shows a very slow development in the beginning of its vegetation period. Due to this fact the competition of weeds is very high in early stages. It is very important to control weeds effectively in the first 50 days after sowing. Additionally Papaver somniferum is rather susceptible to herbicides. The pre-emergence application of the herbicide chlortoluron has been shown to be effective in reducing weed levels. However, in the last decade the weed management of Papaver somniferum has shifted from pre-emergence treatments to post-emergence treatments. Especially the application of the two herbicides mesotrione and tembotrione has become very popular. The combined application of those two herbicides has been shown to be recommendable for effective weed management in Papaver somniferum. Sowing time (autumn or spring), preceding crop and soil texture are important variables influencing the weed species composition. A highly abundant weed species in Papaver somniferum fields was shown to be Papaver rhoeas. Papaver somniferum and Papaver rhoeas belong to the same plant family, which impedes the chemical control of this weed species. Therefore, weed management represents a big challenge and requires technological knowledge from the farmer. In order to increase the efficiency of weed control not only chemical weed control should be applied but also mechanical weed control.

Ornamental
Live plants and seeds of the opium poppy are widely sold by seed companies and nurseries in most of the western world, including the United States. Poppies are sought after by gardeners for the vivid coloration of the blooms, the hardiness and reliability of the poppy plants, the exotic chocolate-vegetal fragrance note of some cultivars, and the ease of growing the plants from purchased flats of seedlings or by direct sowing of the seed. Poppy seed pods are also sold for dried flower arrangements.

Though "opium poppy and poppy straw" are listed in Schedule II of the United States' Controlled Substances Act, P. somniferum can be grown legally in the United States as a seed crop or ornamental flower. During the summer, opium poppies can be seen flowering in gardens throughout North America and Europe, and displays are found in many private plantings, as well as in public botanical and museum gardens such as United States Botanical Garden, Missouri Botanical Garden, and North Carolina Botanical Garden.

Many countries grow the plants, and some rely heavily on the commercial production of the drug as a major source of income. As an additional source of profit, the seeds of the same plants are sold for use in foods, so the cultivation of the plant is a significant source of income. This international trade in seeds of P. somniferum was addressed by a UN resolution "to fight the international trade in illicit opium poppy seeds" on 28 July 1998.

Production

Food

In 2018, world production of poppy seeds for consumption was 76,240 tonnes, led by Turkey with 35% of the world total (table). Poppy seed production and trade are susceptible to fluctuations mainly due to unstable yields. The performance of most genotypes of "Papaver somniferum" is very susceptible to environmental changes This behaviour led to a stagnation of the poppy seed market value between 2008–2009 as a consequence of high stock levels, bad weather and poor quality. The world leading importer of poppy seed is India (16 000 tonnes), followed by Russia, Poland and Germany.

Poppy seed oil remains a niche product due to the lower yield compared to conventional oil crops.

Medicine
Australia (Tasmania), Turkey and India are the major producers of poppy for medicinal purposes and poppy-based drugs, such as morphine or codeine. The New York Times reported, in 2014, that Tasmania was the largest producer of the poppy cultivars used for thebaine (85% of the world's supply) and oripavine (100% of the world's supply) production. Tasmania also had 25% of the world's opium and codeine production.

Restrictions

In most of Central Europe,  poppy seed is commonly used for traditional pastries and cakes, and it is legal to grow poppies throughout the region, although Germany requires a licence.

Since January 1999 in the Czech Republic, according to the 167/1998 Sb. Extraction of opium from the plants is prohibited by law (§ 15 letter d/ of the act). It is also prohibited to grow varieties with more than 0.8% of morphine in dry matter of their capsules, excluding research and experimental purposes (§24/1b/ of the act). The name Czech blue poppy refers to blue poppy seeds used for food.

The United Kingdom does not require a licence for opium poppy cultivation, but does for extracting opium for medicinal products.

In the United States, opium poppies and poppy straw are prohibited. As the opium poppy is legal for culinary or esthetic reasons, poppies were once grown as a cash crop by farmers in California. The law of poppy cultivation in the United States is somewhat ambiguous. The reason for the ambiguity is that the Opium Poppy Control Act of 1942 (now repealed) stated that any opium poppies should be declared illegal, even if the farmers were issued a state permit. § 3 of the Opium Poppy Control Act stated: It shall be unlawful for any person who is not the holder of a license authorizing him to produce the opium poppy, duly issued to him by the Secretary of the Treasury in accordance with the provisions of this Act, to produce the opium poppy, or to permit the production of the opium poppy in or upon any place owned, occupied, used, or controlled by him. This led to the Poppy Rebellion, and to the Narcotics Bureau arresting anyone planting opium poppies and forcing the destruction of poppy fields of anyone who defied the prohibition of poppy cultivation. Though the press of those days favored the Federal Bureau of Narcotics, the state of California supported the farmers who grew opium poppies for their seeds for uses in foods such as  poppy seed muffins. Today, this area of law has remained vague and remains somewhat controversial in the United States. The Opium Poppy Control Act of 1942 was repealed on 27 October 1970.

Canada forbids possessing, seeking or obtaining the opium poppy (Papaver somniferum), its preparations, derivatives, alkaloids and salts, although an exception is made for  poppy seed.

In some parts of Australia, P. somniferum is illegal to cultivate, but in Tasmania, some 50% of the world supply is cultivated.

In New Zealand, it is legal to cultivate the opium poppy as long as it is not used to produce controlled drugs.

In United Arab Emirates the cultivation of the opium poppy is illegal, as is possession of  poppy seed. At least one man has been imprisoned for possessing  poppy seed obtained from a bread roll.

Burma bans cultivation in certain provinces. In northern Burma bans have ended a century-old tradition of growing the opium poppy. Between 20,000 and 30,000 former poppy farmers left the Kokang region as a result of the ban in 2002. People from the Wa region, where the ban was implemented in 2005, fled to areas where growing opium is still possible.

In South Korea, the cultivation of the opium poppy is strictly prohibited.

Uses

History

Use of the opium poppy predates written history. The making and use of opium was known to the ancient Minoans. Its sap was later named opion by the ancient Greeks. The English name is based on the Latin adaptation of the Greek form.
Evidence of the early domestication of opium poppy has been discovered through small botanical remains found in regions of the Mediterranean and west of the Rhine River, predating circa 5000 BC. These samples found in various Neolithic sites show the incredibly early cultivation and natural spread of the plant throughout western Europe.

Opium was used for treating asthma, stomach illnesses, and bad eyesight.

Opium became a major colonial commodity, moving legally and illegally through trade networks on the Indian subcontinent, Colonial America, Qing China and others. Members of the East India Company saw the opium trade as an investment opportunity beginning in 1683. In 1773, the Governor of Bengal established a monopoly on the production of Bengal opium, on behalf of the East India Company administration. The cultivation and manufacture of Indian opium was further centralized and controlled through a series of acts issued between 1797 and 1949. East India Company merchants balanced an economic deficit from the importation of Chinese tea by selling Indian opium which was smuggled into China in defiance of Qing government bans. This trade led to the First and Second Opium Wars.

Many modern writers, particularly in the 19th century, have written on the opium poppy and its effects, notably Thomas de Quincey in Confessions of an English Opium Eater.

The French Romantic composer Hector Berlioz used opium for inspiration, subsequently producing his Symphonie Fantastique. In this work, a young artist overdoses on opium and experiences a series of visions of his unrequited love.

In the US, the Drug Enforcement Administration raided Thomas Jefferson's Monticello estate in 1987. It removed the poppy plants that had been planted continually there since Jefferson was alive and using opium from them. Employees of the foundation also destroyed gift shop items like shirts depicting the poppy and packets of the heirloom seed.

Poppy seeds and oil

Poppy seeds from Papaver somniferum are an important food item and the source of  poppy seed oil, an edible oil that has many uses. The seeds contain very low levels of opiates and the oil extracted from them contains even less. Both the oil and the seed residue also have commercial uses.

The poppy press cake as a residue of the oil pressing can be used as fodder for different animals as e.g., poultry and fancy fowls. Especially in the time of the molt of the birds, the cake is nutritive and fits to their special needs. Next to the animal fodder, poppy offers other by-products. For example, the stem of the plant can be used for energy briquettes and pellets to heat.

Poppy seeds are used as a food in many cultures. They may be used whole by bakers to decorate their products or milled and mixed with sugar as a sweet filling. They have a creamy and nut-like flavor, and when used with ground coconut, the seeds provide a unique and flavour-rich curry base. They can be dry roasted and ground to be used in wet curry (curry paste) or dry curry.

When the European Union attempted to ban the cultivation of Papaver somniferum by private individuals on a small scale (such as personal gardens), citizens in EU countries where poppy seed is eaten heavily, such as countries in the Central-Eastern region, strongly resisted the plan, causing the EU to change course. Singapore, UAE, and Saudi Arabia are among nations that ban even having poppy seeds, not just growing the plants for them. The UAE has a long prison sentence for anyone possessing poppy seeds.

Opiates

The opium poppy, as its name indicates, is the principal source of opium, the dried latex produced by the seed pods. Opium contains a class of naturally occurring alkaloids known as opiates, that include morphine, codeine, thebaine, oripavine, papaverine and noscapine. The specific epithet somniferum means "sleep-bringing", referring to the sedative properties of some of these opiates.

The opiate drugs are extracted from opium. The latex oozes from incisions made on the green seed pods and is collected once dry. Tincture of opium or laudanum, consisting of opium dissolved in alcohol or a mixture of alcohol and water, is one of many unapproved drugs regulated by the U.S. Food and Drug Administration (FDA). Its marketing and distribution persists because its historical use preceded the Federal Food, Drug & Cosmetic Act of 1938. Tincture of opium B.P., containing 1% w/v of anhydrous morphine, also remains in the British Pharmacopoeia, listed as a Class A substance under the Misuse of Drugs Act 1971.

Morphine is the predominant alkaloid found in the cultivated varieties of opium poppy that are used for opium production. Other varieties produce minimal opium or none at all, such as the latex-free Sujata type. Non-opium cultivars that are planted for drug production feature a high level of thebaine or oripavine. Those are refined into drugs like oxycodone. Raw opium contains about 8–14% morphine by dry weight, or more in high-yield cultivars. It may be used directly or chemically modified to produce synthetic opioids such as heroin.

Culture
Opium poppies (flower and fruit) appear on the coat of arms of the Royal College of Anaesthetists.

References

Further reading
 Rätsch, Christian "The Encyclopedia of Psychoactive Plants, Enthnopharmacology and Its Applications" 1998/2005, Rochester, Vermont, Park Street Press,

External links
 
Grow Papaver Somniferum from vizyonpara.com
Comprehensive profile for Papaver somniferum from MaltaWildPlants.com
Opium FAQ v1.0 from Opioids.com
Opium Poppy Cultivation and Heroin Processing in Southeast Asia from the School of Pacific and Asian Studies 
"Downward Spiral – Banning Opium in Afghanistan and Burma", Transnational Institute TNI, Debate Paper, June 2005
"Withdrawal Symptoms in the Golden Triangle – A Drugs Market in Disarray" TNI Paper by Tom Kramer et al.
 Chouvy P.A., 2009, "Opium. Uncovering the Politics of the Poppy", London, I.B. Tauris (Cambridge, Harvard University Press: 2010)

Herbs
Medicinal plants
Morphine
Opium
Entheogens
Soma (drink)
somniferum
Plants described in 1753
Taxa named by Carl Linnaeus
Flora of Malta